The American Mutual Life Association is an ethnic fraternal benefit and social organization for Slovene immigrants and their descendants in the United States. Headquartered in Cleveland, Ohio, it serves a membership located primarily in Ohio. Founded in 1910, as the Slovenska dobrodelna zveza (Slovenian Mutual Benefit Association), the association assumed its current name in 1966. AMLA publishes a newspaper, Our Voice (Glas Adz in Slovene).
The AMLA is licensed to sell Life Insurance and Annuity products in the State of Ohio.

See also 
Slovenian Americans

External links
American Mutual Life Association Home Page
Slovenian Americans

Organizations based in Cleveland
Slovene-American culture in Cleveland
Slovene-American culture in Ohio
Slovene-American history